Francisco Gil Díaz (born 2 September 1943 in Mexico City) is a Mexican economist who served as Secretary of Finance in the cabinet of President Vicente Fox and currently serves as regional chairman of Telefónica for Mexico and Central America.

Early life 
Gil Díaz is the son of Francisco Gil Arias, a fisherman, and Ana María Díaz Perches.
He is married to Margarita White and has four children: two males and two females.

Education 
He received a bachelor's degree in economics from the Autonomous Technology Institute of Mexico (ITAM) and a Ph.D. in economics from the University of Chicago, in the United States. He sits on the board of the Ibero-American University and the Anderson School of Management at UCLA.

Career 
In the public sector Gil Díaz has served as Undersecretary of Finance (1988–1994) and Vice-Governor of the Mexican central bank (1994–1997). In the private sector he worked as CEO of Avantel, a Mexican telephone and internet service provider (1997 - November 2000).

Gil Díaz joined the Institutional Revolutionary Party (PRI) in 1979 and taught economics at the Instituto Tecnológico Autónomo de México, where he is also an emeritus professor and where he also received an honorary degree in May 2009.

Other activities
 European Bank for Reconstruction and Development (EBRD), Ex-Officio Member of the Board of Governors (2000-2006)

Personal life
Gil Díaz is married to Margarita White de la Peña and has four children, including Francisco and Cristina Gil-White.

References

External links

 

Mexican Secretaries of Finance
Mexican economists
Academic staff of the Instituto Tecnológico Autónomo de México
Instituto Tecnológico Autónomo de México alumni
University of Chicago alumni
Institutional Revolutionary Party politicians
People from Mexico City
1943 births
Living people